is a passenger railway station  located in the city of Ashiya, Hyōgo Prefecture, Japan. It is operated by the West Japan Railway Company (JR West).

Lines
All JR Kobe Line commuter trains stop at Ashiya, and the station serves as the connection point between local trains and rapid/special rapid services.

Station layout
The station consists of two ground-level island platforms serving six tracks, connected by an elevated station building.  The outer main lines (tracks 1 and 6) are used by limited express trains and freight trains, and do not have platforms. The station has a Midori no Madoguchi staffed ticket office.

Platforms

Adjacent stations

History
Ashiya Station opened on 1 August 1913.  With the privatization of the Japan National Railways (JNR) on 1 April 1987, the station came under the aegis of the West Japan Railway Company.

Station numbering was introduced to the station in March 2018 with Ashiya being assigned station number JR-A54.

Passenger statistics
In fiscal 2020, the station was used by an average of 21,715 passengers daily

Surrounding area
There is a Daimaru Ashiya store in the station building, which is located in the urban center of Ashiya.

See also
List of railway stations in Japan

References

External links 

 Ashiya Station from JR-Odekake.net 

Railway stations in Hyōgo Prefecture
Railway stations in Japan opened in 1913
Tōkaidō Main Line
Ashiya, Hyōgo